Jane Egan is a British paratriathlete. She competes using a handcycle and a racing wheelchair. She was 2010, 2011 and 2013 World Champion and 2010, 2011 and 2012 and 2013 European Champion in her classification.

Early life
Egan was born on 25 August 1970. She comes from Kilbarchan, near Glasgow.

Sport
In 2007 Egan underwent surgery for a ruptured Achilles tendon, causing complex regional pain syndrome among other conditions, due to nerve trauma. As a result, she had to give up her career as a lawyer, and needs to use a wheelchair.

Before her disability Egan took part in able-bodied sport. She started to take part in triathlon in 2009 and in 2010 was invited to be classified by the British Triathlon Federation. She is classified as a Tri1 paratriathlete.

In 2010, she came first in both the International Triathlon Union World and European championships. She then retained those titles in 2011. In 2013, she won her third World and 4th European title.

Egan was aiming to participate in the 2016 Summer Paralympics. However, she will not compete as women's triathlon will not be held in her classification.

References 

1970 births
Living people
Paratriathletes of Great Britain
British female triathletes
People from Renfrewshire